The 2018 International Champions Cup Women's Tournament was the first edition of a series of friendly women's association football matches. It took place from July 26 to 29, 2018.

For the first time, the ICC included a women's tournament. Nearly a dozen of the regular ICC participant clubs expressed interest in sending their women's sides, but the inaugural women's tournament featured just four teams before expanding in the 2019 ICC. The 2018 tournament featured the semi-finals on July 26, followed by third place play-off and final on July 29, all four matches being held at Hard Rock Stadium in Miami Gardens, Florida. The European participants joined for training sessions at the University of Portland before the tournament.

Teams
Four teams participated in the tournament. English club Chelsea were originally scheduled to participate, but were later replaced by Lyon.

Venue

Bracket

Matches

Semi-finals

Third place play-off

Final

See also
2018 International Champions Cup
International Women's Club Championship

References

External links

2018 Women
2018 in women's association football
2018 in American women's soccer
2018 in sports in Florida
Soccer in Florida
Sports competitions in Miami Gardens, Florida
July 2018 sports events in the United States